African Moot is a 2022 South African documentary film written and directed by lawyer turned filmmmaker Shameela Seedat. The film is based on a set of aspiring lawyers who compete in the African Human Rights Moot Court Competition by representng the top law schools from their respective nations and they turn up for the event which is held in Gaborone, Botswana for a duration of one week at the African Court of Human Rights where social topics are taken up for debates which are deemed as fictional court cases. According to The Africa Report, it was ranked among top ten most notable African films of 2022.

Synopsis 
The documentary encompasses and eloborates about how passionate are the young African law students about their causes and how their ideas are generally very progressive, while aiming to protect the weakest parts of African society including the human rights of migrants in Africa as well as the members of the LGBTQ community. The African lawmakers reflect on their thought process through their extraordinary oratory skills and knowledge about the law for the mock-trial at the African Human Rights Moot Court Competition, an open platform and discourse where these young African law students can raise their voice and give their opinions and debate about the most pressing human rights concerns in African region.

Production 
The film was produced by Generation Africa in collaboration with Social Transformation and Empowerment Projects (STEPS), Undercurrent Film & Television and Tuffi Films. The film was one of the 25 films which was selected for the Generation Africa project. The film project marked the second documentary directorial venture for filmmaker Shameela Seedat after Whispering Truth to Power (2018). The filmmaker Shameela Seedat arranged teams from four different nations for the documentary including law students from Makerere University in Uganda, American University in Cairo in Egypt, University of Cape Town in South Africa and University of Nairobi in Kenya.

Release 
The film was officially selected to be screened at the 2022 Hot Docs Canadian International Documentary Festival and was also selected to premiere at the Encounters South African International Documentary Festival. The film was also premiered at the 2022 Internationales Dokumentarfilmfestival München (DOK.fest München). The film was also screened at the 2022 Sydney Film Festival and was one of the two films from Generation Africa project to have been screened at the 2022 Sydney Film Festival with the other being No Simple Way Home. The film also screened at the 2022 Durban International Film Festival, 2022 Doc NYC and 2022 International Documentary Film Festival Amsterdam. The film was also screened at the Helsinki International Film Festival in September 2022.

Accolades 
The film won the Best African Documentary award at the Zimbabwe International Film Festival. It was also nominated in the category for Best Documentary at the Africa Movie Academy Awards in October 2022.

References 

South African documentary films
2022 films
2022 documentary films
Films shot in Botswana
2020s Portuguese-language films
2020s English-language films
2020s French-language films
Swahili-language films
2022 multilingual films
South African multilingual films